Rukometni klub Nexe Našice, commonly referred to as RK Nexe Našice or simply Nexe, is a handball club from Našice, Croatia. Currently, RK Nexe competes in the Premijer liga and Croatian Handball Cup as well in the SEHA League and in the EHF European League.

History

Since its formation in 1959, the club carried names like "Partizan", "NAŠK", "Kobra Jeans" and simply "Našice". In 2006 Nexe Group became main club sponsor and since then club carries present name. Since the 2008/2009 season, the team has always finished second in the league behind RK Zagreb. The club made its international debut in the 2008/09 EHF Cup. Since then, he has participated in this competition every season.

Crest, colours, supporters

Kits

Management

Team

Current squad
Squad for the 2022–23 season

               
Goalkeepers
1  Dominik Kuzmanović
 12  Moreno Car
 16  Mihailo Radovanović
Left Wingers
4  Aleksandar Bakić
 18  Marin Jelinić
 24  Karlo Godec
Right Wingers
7  Fran Mileta
 44  Fahrudin Melić
Line Players 
 3  Marko Racič
 33  Mario Tomić
 87  Gianfranco Pribetić

Left Backs
 21  Alen Blažević
 23  Tomislav Severec
 27  Luka Moslavac
Central Backs
 22  Andraž Velkavrh
 28  Janko Kević
 77  Dorian Markušić
Right Backs
 10  Predrag Vejin
 13  Ivan Sršen
 20  Borna Manci Mičević

Technical staff
 Head coach:  Branko Tamše
 Assistant coach:  Albin Eter
 Goalkeeping coach:  Ninoslav Pavelić
 Fitness coach:  Mirko Krolo
 Physiotherapist:  Gabrijel Hmura
 Physiotherapist:  Roberto Fadljević

Transfers

Transfers for the 2023–24 season

Joining 
  Manuel Štrlek (LW) (from  Telekom Veszprém)
  Adir Cohen (LB) (from  Tremblay-en-France)
  Marko Bezjak (CB) (from  SC Magdeburg)
  Filip Glavaš (RW) (from  RK Trimo Trebnje) ?

Leaving 
  Tomislav Severec (LB) (to  Handball Sport Verein Hamburg)
  Fran Mileta (RW) (to  Tatabánya KC) ?
  Gianfranco Pribetić (P) (to  RK Zagreb) ?

Accomplishments
Croatian First League of Handball
 Runner-up: 2009, 2021, 2022
Croatian Handball Cup
 Runner-up: 2015, 2017, 2018, 2021
EHF Cup
 Quarter-finals: 2017–18

EHF ranking

Former club members

Notable former players

  Alen Blažević (2009–2011, 2021–)
  Josip Božić Pavletić (2012–2017)
  Marko Buvinić (2017–2021)
  Ante Gadža (2014–2019)
  Šime Ivić (2012–2014)
  Halil Jaganjac (2018–2022)
  Pavle Jurina (1976–1980)
  Nikola Kedžo (2010–2012)
  Krešimir Kozina (2011–2013)
  Franjo Lelić (2008–2015)
  Fran Mileta (2019–)
  Marko Mrđenović (2008–2021)
  Sandro Obranović (2012–2013)
  Kristian Pilipović (2017–2018)
  Marin Šipić (2017–2019)
  Ivan Slišković (2011–2013)
  Ivan Sršen (2015–2018, 2019–2020, 2022–)
  Mate Šunjić (2010–2013)
  Mario Tomić (2017–)
  Ivan Vida (2018–2022)
  Vedran Zrnić (2015–2019)
  Mirko Herceg (2014–2017)
  Marin Vegar (2013–2018)
  Aleksandar Bakić (2020–)
  Fahrudin Melić (2021–)
  Saša Barišić-Jaman (2005–2012, 2015–2022)
  Matjaž Brumen (2018)
  Patrik Leban (2017–2019)
  Gregor Lorger (2016–2017)
  David Špiler (2016–2017)
  Živan Pešić (2019–2021)
  Predrag Vejin (2021–)
  Can Çelebi (2014–2015, 2018–2019)

Former coaches

References

External links
  
 

Nasice
Handball clubs established in 1959
Našice